Edward Bellasis may refer to:
Edward Bellasis (lawyer) (1800–1873), English serjeant-at-law and Roman Catholic convert
Edward Bellasis (officer of arms) (1852–1922), his son, English genealogist